The Division of Boothby is an Australian federal electoral division in South Australia. The division was one of the seven established when the former Division of South Australia was redistributed on 2 October 1903 and is named after William Boothby (1829–1903), the Returning Officer for the first federal election.

At the 2016 federal election, the seat covered 130 km², extending from Clarence Gardens and Urrbrae in the north to Marino and part of Happy Valley in the south, including the suburbs of Belair, Blackwood, Brighton, Daw Park, Eden Hills, Marion, Mitcham, Seacliff, St Marys and Panorama.

Geography
Since 1984, federal electoral division boundaries in Australia have been determined at redistributions by a redistribution committee appointed by the Australian Electoral Commission. Redistributions occur for the boundaries of divisions in a particular state, and they occur every seven years, or sooner if a state's representation entitlement changes or when divisions of a state are malapportioned.

History
Before 1949 and the creation of the Division of Sturt, Boothby covered most of the southern and eastern suburbs of Adelaide. For much of the first half-century after Federation, it was one of only three seats based on the capital, the others being Adelaide and Hindmarsh. The mostly rural seat of Barker was then considered a "hybrid urban-rural" seat, stretching all the way from the southern tip of South Australia at least as far as Glenelg and the Holdfast Bay area, and at times even stretched as far as the western metropolitan suburbs of Keswick and Henley Beach.

For most of the first half-century after Federation, Boothby was a marginal seat that changed hands several times between the Liberal Party of Australia (and its predecessors) and the Australian Labor Party (ALP). The 1949 expansion of parliament saw parts of the southern portion transferred to the newly created Division of Kingston and parts of the eastern portion transferred to the newly created Sturt. This saw Boothby change from a marginal Labor seat on a 1.8 percent two-party margin to a marginal Liberal seat on a two percent two-party margin.  However, as part of the massive Liberal victory in the 1949 election, the Liberals picked up a 9.3 percent two-party swing, turning it into a safe Liberal seat in one stroke.  The Liberals held the seat for the next 73 years mostly as a fairly safe to safe Liberal seat.

There was only one substantial redistribution in the past few decades, when Boothby absorbed parts of the abolished Division of Hawker prior to the 1993 election.  This cut the Liberal margin by more than half, from a safe 10.7 two-party margin to a marginal notional 4.5 percent two-party margin. However, the Liberals won the seat on a fairly safe 7.8 percent two-party margin. As of 2007, Boothby extended from Mitcham and Belair in the east to Brighton and Seacliff in the west.

Boothby's most prominent member was Steele Hall, who most notably served as Premier of South Australia from 1968 to 1970. After leaving state politics, Hall served in the Senate before transferring to Boothby in a 1981 by-election. Hall retired at the 1996 election and the seat was subsequently held from 1996 to 2016 by Andrew Southcott. Other notable members include Lee Batchelor, a minister in the Watson and Fisher governments; Sir John McLeay, who was Speaker from 1956 to 1966, and his son John, Jr., a minister in the Fraser government.

At the 2004 election, despite a solid national two-party swing and vote to the Liberals, Boothby became a marginal Liberal seat for the first time in over half a century, with Labor's Chloë Fox reducing the Liberal margin to 5.4 percent even as incumbent Andrew Southcott narrowly won enough primary votes to retain the seat without the need for preferences. Labor's Nicole Cornes reduced Southcott's margin even further to 2.9 percent at the 2007 election.  At the 2010 election Labor's Annabel Digance came within 638 votes of ending the long Liberal run in the seat.  At 0.75 percent Boothby was the most marginal seat in South Australia. However, Boothby became a fairly safe Liberal seat again at the 2013 election.

In 2015, Southcott announced his retirement from parliament to take effect at the 2016 federal election. The Liberals preselected doctoral student and newspaper columnist Nicolle Flint. Labor preselected 2015 Davenport state by-election candidate Mark Ward. The Nick Xenophon Team announced Mitcham councillor Karen Hockley as their candidate. ABC psephologist Antony Green's 2016 federal election guide for South Australia stated NXT had a "strong chance of winning lower house seats and three or four Senate seats". Flint won the contest. Flint held on narrowly on 53.5 percent of the two-party vote on a swing of 3.6 percent, making the seat marginal once again.

A redistribution ahead of the 2019 federal election pared back the Liberal margin further, to 2.7 percent. This came even as Boothby absorbed Glenelg and much of the Holdfast Bay area from neighbouring Hindmarsh. Flint won reelection again, despite suffering a swing of 1.3 points. With a margin of 1.3 points, Boothby was the most marginal seat in South Australia, and one of the most marginal metropolitan Coalition seats in Australia at the 2022 election.

On 26 February 2021, Flint announced her retirement from parliament to take effect at the 2022 Australian federal election.  Vinnies SA CEO Louise Miller-Frost was preselected by Labor in mid-2021, and won the seat at the 21 May 2022 Federal election with 4.66% swing.  The seat now has a 3.28% margin.

Members

Election results

See also
 2016 Australian federal election
 Results of the Australian federal election, 2016 (South Australia)

References
 ABC profile for Boothby: 2016
 Poll Bludger profile for Boothby: 2016
 AEC profile for Boothby: 2016

Notes

External links
 SA boundary map, 2001: AEC
 SA boundary map, 1984: Atlas SA

Electoral divisions of Australia
Constituencies established in 1903
1903 establishments in Australia